Tepalcatepec is a city and municipality in the Mexican state of Michoacan. As of the 2010 census, it has a population of 34,678.

Geography 
The municipality is located in the west of the state, 267 kilometres from the state capital of Morelia. It has an average altitude of 370 meters above sea level.

History 

Before European settlement, the area was settled by the  Chichimecas tribe. 

On June 22, 1877, Tepalcatepec was established as a town.

A battle between the Jalisco New Generation Cartel and state defense forces in the town left 9 dead and 11 injured.
Since 2020 the town has been on lockdown due to El Abuelos cartel turf war with El Menchos cartel.

References 

Municipalities of Michoacán